Curtain of Fear is a 1953 thriller novel by the British writer Dennis Wheatley.

During the early stages of the Cold War, a Czech-born British professor attempts to make his escape from Communist Czechoslovakia across the Iron Curtain into the West.

References

Bibliography
 Reilly, John M. Twentieth Century Crime & Mystery Writers. Springer, 2015.
 Williams, Emma & Sheeha, Iman.  Deception: An Interdisciplinary Exploration. BRILL,  2019.

1953 British novels
Novels by Dennis Wheatley
Novels set in Czechoslovakia
British thriller novels
Novels set during the Cold War
Hutchinson (publisher) books